The 2006–07 A1 Grand Prix of Nations, Mexico was an A1 Grand Prix race, held on March 25, 2007, at Autódromo Hermanos Rodríguez, Mexico. This was the ninth race in the 2006-07 A1 Grand Prix season and the first meeting held at the circuit.

Report

Practice

Qualifying

Sprint race

Main race

Results

Qualification

Sprint Race Results
The Sprint Race took place on Sunday, March 25, 2007.

Feature Race Results
The Feature Race took place on Sunday, March 25, 2007.

Total Points

 Fastest Lap:

References

Mexico
A1 Grand Prix